Cody Franklin Stanley (born December 21, 1988) is an American former Major League Baseball (MLB) catcher who played for the St. Louis Cardinals in 2015. Stanley was twice suspended during his professional playing career for violating Major League Baseball's drug policy.

Amateur career

Stanley attended the University of North Carolina at Wilmington, and in 2009 he played collegiate summer baseball with the Cotuit Kettleers of the Cape Cod Baseball League where he was named a league all-star. The St. Louis Cardinals drafted Stanley in the fourth round of the 2010 Major League Baseball Draft.

Professional career

Minor leagues

Commencing his Minor League Baseball career with the Johnson City Cardinals in 2010, Stanley batted .321 and contributed to winning the Appalachian League title.  He played for the Quad City River Bandits in 2011 and they won the Midwest League title.  In 2012, Stanley was suspended 50 games after testing positive for methylhexanamine and tamoxifen, prohibited substances under Major League Baseball's drug policy.  While playing for the double-A Springfield Cardinals in 2014, Stanley was Texas League All-Star Game Most Valuable Player (MVP) after hitting a home run.

Major leagues
The Cardinals added Stanley to the 40-man roster on November 19, 2014.  He made his major league debut on April 26, 2015, in a 6–3 loss to the Milwaukee Brewers, and singled in his first at bat.  Stanley spent most of the 2015 season with the triple-A Memphis Redbirds, batting .241 with seven home runs, 45 runs batted in (RBI) and a slugging percentage (SLG) of .359.  He returned to the Cardinals in September when MLB rosters expanded and garnered four hits in ten at bats in his first major league season.  On September 12, he was suspended 80 games after testing positive for 4-Chlorodehydromethyltestosterone, also known as Turinabol, a prohibited substance under MLB's drug policy.  It was the second such suspension in his professional career.  On December 2, 2015, the Cardinals elected not to tender him a contract for the following season, thereby making him a free agent.

Weeks before he was due to appeal, MLB announced on July, 2016, that Stanley was suspended for 162 games for violating the league's drug policy a third time after again testing positive for Turinabol, before he had completed his second suspension.

Sugar Land Skeeters
On February 7, 2019, after several years out of professional baseball, Stanley signed with the Sugar Land Skeeters of the independent Atlantic League of Professional Baseball. He became a free agent following the season.

See also
 List of Major League Baseball players suspended for performance-enhancing drugs

References

External links

 
 

1988 births
Living people
People from Clinton, North Carolina
Baseball players from North Carolina
Major League Baseball catchers
St. Louis Cardinals players
UNC Wilmington Seahawks baseball players
Cotuit Kettleers players
Johnson City Cardinals players
Quad Cities River Bandits players
Gulf Coast Cardinals players
Palm Beach Cardinals players
Surprise Saguaros players
Springfield Cardinals players
Peoria Chiefs players
Memphis Redbirds players
Sugar Land Skeeters players
American sportspeople in doping cases
Major League Baseball players suspended for drug offenses